Mario Kart: Bowser's Challenge (known in Japan as ) is an augmented reality dark ride that serves as the anchor attraction of Super Nintendo World at Universal Studios Japan and Universal Studios Hollywood, and under construction at Universal Studios Singapore and the upcoming Universal's Epic Universe. The ride is primarily based on the Mario Kart 8 video game.

Summary

Queue 
The ride's exterior and queue are modeled after Bowser's Castle. The queue gradually reveals that the ride's plot involves "Team Bowser" (Bowser and the Koopalings) challenging "Team Mario" (Mario, Luigi, Peach, Daisy, Toad, and Yoshi) to the "Universal Cup."

Pre-show 
Guests are given the augmented reality's visors and enter the first pre-show room, which features Lakitu and Mii characters showing how to put on and adjust the visor. Guests then enter the second pre-show room, filled with replicas of Mii outfits from Mario Kart 8. Here, Lakitu explains the ride vehicles and the shooting gallery-esque gameplay:

The four-person vehicles (modeled after "karts" from Mario Kart 8) follow a set path on a railtrack. Guests attach the AR visors to the AR lenses in the vehicles, to view the Mario characters racing alongside them. Guests rotate their AR-wearing heads around to aim their Koopa Shell ammo, and press a button on their steering wheel to fire the shells at characters within the augmented reality. Guests accumulate points during the ride by successfully hitting the "Team Bowser" characters with their shells. If all four riders turn their wheels in unison at certain turns, they'll "drift" into the turn, earning more points.

Ride 
After leaving the boarding station, the ride vehicles turn into a corner where guests can practice aiming and firing in the augmented reality before heading to the starting line.

The ride then takes guests through a variety of locations from Mario Kart 8, including: N64 Royal Raceway, GBA Mario Circuit, 3DS Piranha Plant Slide, Dolphin Shoals, Twisted Mansion, Cloudtop Cruise, Wii Grumble Volcano, and N64 Rainbow Road. If riders collectively earn 100 points, the ride ends with "Team Mario" winning the race. However, if riders don't accumulate enough points, they'll see an alternate ending where "Team Bowser" wins.

Point tallies are shown at the end of the ride, similar to Toy Story Mania. If guests scan their Power-Up Band against the steering wheel, they can log and keep track of their high-score for the ride on the official Universal Studios smartphone applications.

Reception 
The ride has received mixed reception from critics. The attraction has been praised for its innovative technology, intricate theming, detailed sets, and special effects. However, it has also been criticized for moving at a slow pace, since the attraction is based on a high-speed racing franchise, and the AR lenses offering a narrow view of the characters.

History 

The layout and details of the attraction were revealed across several years worth of leaked photographs, patents, and construction. Universal confirmed the attraction via the "We Are Born to Play" music video on January 13, 2020, but official details were still kept to a minimum. The attraction was then formally unveiled on November 30, 2020.

The ride, alongside the rest of Universal Studios Japan, was temporarily closed on April 25, 2021 amid rising concerns regarding the COVID-19 pandemic; the park reopened in June of the same year, maintaining enhanced health and safety protocols.

Notes

References

External links
 Official website (Japan)
 Official website (Hollywood)

Amusement rides based on video game franchises
Amusement rides introduced in 2021
Amusement rides introduced in 2023
Koopa's Challenge
Universal Studios Japan
Universal Studios Hollywood
Universal's Epic Universe
Universal Studios Singapore
2021 establishments in Japan
2023 establishments in California
Licensed properties at Universal Parks & Resorts
Amusement rides planned to open in 2025